Kevin O'Keeffe (born 22 October 1952) is a former Australian rules footballer who played with Fitzroy in the VFL during the 1970s.

O'Keeffe, a half back, represented Victoria in an interstate match against Western Australia at the 1975 Knockout Carnival. In the same year, while playing for Fitzroy, he accidentally collided with Footscray's Neil Sachse, leaving Sachse a quadriplegic.

In 1980 he transferred to East Perth where he played for two seasons before making an unsuccessful comeback with Fitzroy. His next port of call was Queensland club Coorparoo and he played in their 1984 and 1986 premiership sides. The red haired O'Keeffe later served briefly as coach of Coorparoo and while in Queensland represented the state on 16 occasions, captaining them in 1986.

References

External links

Holmesby, Russell and Main, Jim (2007). The Encyclopedia of AFL Footballers. 7th ed. Melbourne: Bas Publishing.

1952 births
Living people
Australian rules footballers from Victoria (Australia)
Fitzroy Football Club players
East Perth Football Club players
Coorparoo Football Club players
Terang Football Club players